Wammo is an album by New Zealand band Bailter Space, released in 1995. It reached number 31 in New Zealand upon original release. Matador Records reissued the album on vinyl in 2021 for its 25th anniversary, after which it reached a new peak of number 23 in New Zealand.

Critical reception
Andrew Earles, in Gimme Indie Rock: 500 Essential American Underground Rock Albums 1981-1996, wrote that "Bailter Space's final album for Matador (fifth overall) finds the band showing everyone how skilled it was at erasing any lines of demarcation separating wickedly catchy pop songs and washes of guitar noise and toothy dynamics." Dave Thompson, in Alternative Rock, called it "their most conventional hook-laden missive yet."

Track listing
 "Untied" – 3:28
 "Splat" – 3:49
 "At Five We Drive" – 3:08
 "Zapped" – 2:11
 "Colours" – 3:58
 "Retro" – 4:29
 "Glimmer" – 4:07
 "Voltage" – 4:36
 "D Thing" – 6:24
 "Wammo" – 2:25

Charts

References

Bailter Space albums
1995 albums
Matador Records albums
Flying Nun Records albums